The Cupa României Final was the final match of the 2012–13 Cupa României, played between Petrolul Ploiești and CFR Cluj. The match was played on 1 June 2013 at the Arena Națională in Bucharest. Petrolul Ploiești won the match 1-0, triumphing for the 3rd time in this competition while CFR Cluj lost its first final. It was the second final played on the Arena Națională and the second in Bucharest since 2006. Jeremy Bokila scored the only goal of the match in the 8th minute and was named Man of the Match. Winners Petrolul Ploiești will face Romanian Champions, on the same stadium on 10 July in the Romanian Supercup.

Route to the final

Match

References

External links
 Official site 

2013
2012–13 in Romanian football
CFR Cluj matches